Sanjhbati is a Bengali drama film directed by Leena Gangopadhyay and Saibal Banerjee and  produced by Atanu Ray Chaudhuri. The film was released on 20 December 2019 under the banner of Bengal Talkies.

Plot

The film reflects the loneliness of an old lady, Sulekha, who lives alone because her son works outside of India. The tale has been spun around a lonely mother who is missing her son. It also tells how the old lady interacts with her caretakers. The lives of the caretakers have also been emphasized in a very interesting way.

Cast

References

External links
 

2019 films
2019 drama films
Indian drama films
Bengali-language Indian films
2010s Bengali-language films